The Obregonians, or the Minim Congregation of Poor Brothers Infirmarians, were a small Roman Catholic congregation of men dedicated to the nursing care of the sick, who professed the Rule of the Third Order Regular of St. Francis.

History
They were founded by Bernardino de Obregón (born 5 May 1540, at Las Huelgas near Burgos, Spain; died 6 August 1599, Madrid). Of a noble family, Obregón was an officer in the Spanish army, but he retired from military duty and dedicated himself to the service of the sick in the hospitals of Madrid. He spent 20 years working in various hospitals in the city, and became the director of the General Hospital of the city. During this time, he developed insights into the effective care of the sick, which he went on to pass on to the men who joined him.
 
Others became associated with him in hospital service and in 1567, by consent of the papal nuncio at Madrid, a new congregation was founded. To the three ordinary religious vows was added that of free hospitality. The congregation did not found hospitals but served in those already existing. It spread in Spain and its dependencies, in Belgium and the Indies.

The motherhouse was at the Convent of Our Lady of Victory on the Puerta del Sol in Madrid, adjacent to the Church of Our Lady of Good Success. This had been founded as the hospital for the Royal Court in 1529, when the Emperor Charles V decreed that this facility was no longer to move about the country with the court but was to be established at this site. Both structures were demolished in the 19th century, in the course of renovating the plaza. It was entrusted to the care of the Brothers by King Philip II. 
 
Obregón was invited to the Portuguese capital Lisbon in 1592, where he founded an asylum for orphan boys. Returning to Spain he assisted King Philip in his last illness (1598).
 
Pope Paul V, in 1609, allowed the Obregonians to wear a black cross on the left side of the breast over the grey religious habit of the Third Order of St. Francis, to distinguish them from similar congregations. In 1617, an Obregonian Brother, Andrés Fernández, published the first manual of nursing care developed by and intended for nurses, Training Nurses and a Method for applying Remedies to all Forms of Illness.
 
Since the French occupation of Spain they have entirely disappeared. Streets in Madrid and Barcelona remain named for Obregón.

References

Men's congregations of the Franciscan Third Order Regular
Catholic religious orders established in the 16th century
Nursing in Spain
Catholic nursing orders